Palliyur is a village in the Papanasam taluk of Thanjavur district, Tamil Nadu, India.

Demographics 

As per the 2001 census, Palliyur had a total population of 2000 with 996 males and 1004 females. The sex ratio was 1008. The literacy rate was 66.02.

References 

 

Villages in Thanjavur district